Charles L. "Chick" Atkinson (January 16, 1918 – January 4, 1962) was an American football coach. He served as the head football coach at Brigham Young University (BYU) from 1949 to 1955, compiling a record of 18–49–3. This included an 0–11 record in 1949.

Atkinson was a native of Pocatello, Idaho.  In high school, he was all-state in football and basketball.  He graduated from the University of Idaho, where was the captain of the football and basketball teams.  Prior to his tenure at BYU, Atkinson coached football at Pocatello High School, where his record was 38–11.  He died in 1962 at the age of 43 of a possible stroke.

Head coaching record

References

External links
 

1918 births
1962 deaths
Sportspeople from Pocatello, Idaho
Basketball players from Idaho
American men's basketball players
Idaho Vandals men's basketball players
Players of American football from Idaho
Idaho Vandals football players
Coaches of American football from Idaho
High school football coaches in Idaho
BYU Cougars football coaches